The MCV EvoTor (stylised as eVoTor; internal designation MCV 523) is a model of coach bodywork produced by Manufacturing Commercial Vehicles (MCV) on Volvo B11R chassis since 2018, mainly for the United Kingdom and Ireland market. The first production EvoTor was unveiled at the 2018 Euro Bus Expo at the National Exhibition Centre, Birmingham on 30 October 2018. The EvoTor is MCV's first coach product for the British and Irish market, created in collaboration with Golden Tours, a long-standing MCV operator. The EvoTor is produced at the main MCV factory in El Salheya, Egypt.

The EvoTor is built as the entry-level body option to the Volvo B11R coach range, on the twin-axle model only, and with a relatively fixed set of specifications in order to reduce costs. The bodywork construction is all-stainless steel, taking design cues from the existing MCV Evora and EvoSeti service buses, such as the general headlight design, which has been modernised slightly for the EvoTor. The EvoTor also comes as standard with reclining BRUSA Create passenger seats, induction heating, air conditioning and Bosch entertainment systems.

Golden Tours are the launch customer and largest operator of the EvoTor, taking delivery of the first eight production vehicles in May 2019. Three more EvoTors have been built as stock and demonstration vehicles as of June 2019, while one has been delivered to Ashwood Travel of Chalfont St Peter. One has gone to Ridleys. One has also gone to Skills, Nottingham with another one soon and 5 more on order for Silverdale, Nottingham.

See also 
Contemporary coaches on Volvo B11R chassis:
Plaxton Elite 2
Plaxton Panther 3
Sunsundegui SC7
VDL Jonckheere JHV2

References 

Coaches (bus)
Vehicles introduced in 2018